Porque el amor manda (literal translation Because Love Rules, but simply known in English speaking marketings as Love Rules) is a 2012 Mexican soap opera produced by Juan Osorio for Televisa. It is a remake of the Colombian telenovela El secretario, produced by Juan Andrés Flórez in 2011.

Fernando Colunga and Blanca Soto star as the protagonists, while Claudia Álvarez and Erick Elías star as the antagonists.

History
On October 8, 2012, Canal de las Estrellas started broadcasting Porque el amor manda weeknights at 8:25pm, replacing Por Ella Soy Eva. The last episode was broadcast on June 16, 2013, with Libre para amarte replacing it the following day. Production of Porque el amor manda officially started on August 13, 2012.

On March 11, 2013, Univision started broadcasting Porque el amor manda weeknights at 8pm/7c, replacing Por Ella Soy Eva. The last episode was broadcast on November 20, 2013, with Corazón Indomable replacing it. Starting December 2, Por Siempre mi Amor replaced one hour of Corazón Indomable, taking the former timeslot of Porque el amor manda at 8pm/7c until its conclusion on June 9, 2014.

Plot
Jesus is a really nice guy; he is always smiling, caring and looking at the bright side of life. He works as a pizza delivery guy and in a restaurant kitchen, too. He also studies administration at night. He arrived in Chicago six years ago when he left his hometown, Monterrey, after ending a tormenting relationship with Veronica, who suffocated him with her obsessive order. When they broke up, he decided to change his environment and left Mexico, chasing the American dream. 

Through a social network, he finds out that Veronica has a 6-year-old daughter called Valentina. Immediately, Jesus realizes that lovely girl could be his daughter, and bringing his past back to life, he decides to call his ex-girlfriend and discover the truth. Verónica admits Valentina is his daughter but tells him that she does not need him in her life since she is married to a wonderful man; but Jesus is eager to meet his daughter, so he decides to get back.
Since he has no money saved, he turns to Ury, a Russian immigrant and regular customer at the pizza restaurant. Ury helps him by buying the plane ticket for him, but in return, Ury asks Jesus to bring a suitcase full of clothes for an orphanage. Jesus accepts right away, happy to have the chance to meet his little daughter; however, he is unaware that the suitcase has a hidden compartment with almost a million dollars in it. Ury calls Rogelio Rivadeneira, owner and chairman to a successful company, and informs him that his money is on its way. Rogelio is an arrogant and successful man for whom the most important thing in life is himself. Not even Alma, his beautiful girlfriend, comes first in his heart. 

When Jesus arrives at the airport in Monterrey, he is arrested for money laundering and is presented before the authority. Unbeknownst to Jesus, he has committed a federal crime, and with no other options, he tells everything he knows. This way, Ury is arrested in Chicago, and Jesus is freed under custody. When Rogelio learns he has lost nearly a million dollars, he swears to take revenge from the one who spoiled his business. 

With his life completely destroyed, out of money, jobless and now with a criminal record, Jesus must start over. He shows up at Veronica's and he can finally hold Valentina in his arms, but Veronica demands him to have a job and a place to live in order to let him see his daughter again. He later forms a friendship with Veronica's husband Elias Franco. 

When Alma, Rogelio's beautiful and talented girlfriend, discovers Rogelio's brother, Fernando, having an affair with one of the company's secretaries, she decides angrily to get a secretary with whom Fernando cannot fool around, and plans to hire the ugliest one there is. However, it is destiny that brings Jesus to apply for a job there. When Alma and Jesus meet... something happens between them...their looks, their hearts, they have fallen in love but without knowing it. 

Jesus is looking for a job in the accounting department, and Alma is looking for a secretary, but none of them clarifies that and Alma thinks it is not a bad idea to have an efficient male secretary instead of a sexy woman. Ignoring his criminal record, she decides to hire Jesus without letting him know the position for which he is being hired. 

Jesus finds a place to live at a tenement house, downtown. There, he meets his neighbor, Luisa Herrera ( nicknamed "Chatita"), a sophisticated woman who is in the first phase of Alzheimer, but happens to be absolutely adorable. That woman is like a mother to him. 

When Jesus is told that he will be the company's secretary, he rejects the job, arguing that he is more than just a secretary and leaves the company angrily. Chatita reminds him that if he wants to see his daughter, he is to accept the job. This way, Jesus goes back to the company, ready to become the best of secretaries; however, he is unaware that the company's owner is also the owner of the suitcase full of money that was confiscated at the airport. On top of that, Fernando, who is also going to be his boss, has decided to make his life miserable in order to make him quit and have Jessica back.

Cast 
 Fernando Colunga - Jesús Chucho García 
 Blanca Soto - Alma Montemayor Mejía
 Carmen Salinas - Luisa "Chatita" Herrera
 María Elisa Camargo - Patricia Zorrilla "Pato“ De Rivadeneira
 Erick Elías - Rogelio Rivadeneira Ruvalcaba
 Claudia Álvarez - Verónica Hierro 
 Jorge Aravena - Elías Franco   
 Julissa - Susana Arriaga
 Alejandro Ávila - Fernando Rivadeneira Ruvalcaba 
 Kika Edgar - Xóchitl Martínez De Rivadeneira / Natasha
 Violeta Isfel - Marisela Pérez-Castellanos  
 Beatriz Morayra - Marcia Ferrer / Martha Ferrer
 Ninel Conde - Discua Paz de la Soledad
 Darío Ripoll - Oliverio Cárdenas
 Rubén Cerda - Gilberto Godínez
 Ricardo Fastlicht - Ricardo Bautista
 Ricardo Margaleff - Julio Pando
 María José Mariscal - Valentina Franco Hierro / Valentina García Hierro
 Jeimy Osorio - Jéssica Reyes De Cardenas
 Antonio Medellín - Pánfilo Pérez
 Ricardo Kleinbaum - Malvino Guerra
 Enrique Lizalde - Sebastián Montemayor 
 Sussan Taunton - Agente Delia Torres
 Juan Ignacio Aranda - Máximo Valtierra
 Raúl Buenfil - Lic. Cantú 
 Marco Corleone - Uri Petrovsky
 Yhoana Marell - Minerva
 Mago Rodal - Domitila
 Eugenio Cobo - Padre Domingo
 Paulina Vega - Nancy
 Emmanuel Lira - Melchor 
 Mario Discua - Gaspar
 Andrea Torre - Aída
 Adriana Laffan - Begoña de Godínez
 Julio Arroyo - Remigio
 Rafael del Villar - Eugenio
 Luis Bayardo - Hernán
 Alejandra Robles Gil - Alejandra
 Ivonne Soto - Ivonne
 Daniela Amaya - Romina
 Thelma Tixou - Genoveva
 Laura Denisse - Laura
 David Ostrosky - Lic. Astudillo
 Mercedes Vaughan - Bárbara Martínez
 Nuria Bages - Teté Corcuera 
 Helena Guerrero - Lic. Vivian 
 María José - Lic. María José 
 Marilyz León - Raymunda "Ray" 
 Michelle López - Renato 
 Thaily Amezcua - Virginia "Viggie"
 Elizabeth Guindi - Valeria
 Ilithya Manzanilla - Cynthia Cabello 
 Paul Stanley - Melquiades Quijano
 Claudia Silva - Augusta Constante Durán
 Humberto Elizondo - Augusto Constante
 Gerardo Albarrán - Nick Donovan
 Pepe Olivares - Saturnino
 Paola Archer - Jueza Gisela
 Norma Lazareno - Tracy Rodríguez
 Mauricio Martínez - Héctor Rodríguez 
 Eduardo Carbajal - Dr. Isalas
 Kelchie Arizmendi - Doctor Muñiz
 Jorge Pondal - Luigi Ferrari
 Iván Caraza - Doctor Gutiérrez
 Marco Méndez - Diego Armando Manríquez
 Arath de la Torre - Francisco "Pancho" López Fernández / Francisco Corcuera Peñaloza
 Mayrín Villanueva - Rebeca Treviño Garza
 Alicia Machado - Candelaria "Candy" de los Ángeles López Fernández
 Mónica Dossetti - Cassandra
 Marco Di Mauro - Himself
 Grupo Matute - Themselves
 Mariano Osorio - Himself 
 Moisés Muñoz - Goalkeeper of Club America
 Miguel Layún - Player of Club America
 Andrés Bonfiglio - Detective
 Laura Denisse - Laura
 Jorge Alberto Suárez - Champiñón
 Catalina López - Hiena
 Yekaterina Kiev - Candela
 Ricardo de León - Receptionst
 Alma Cero - Luisa López
 América Sierra - Herself
 3BallMTY - Themselves
 Ilse Ikeda - English Maestro

Soundtrack

Awards and nominations

References

External links
 

2012 telenovelas
2012 Mexican television series debuts
2013 Mexican television series endings
Mexican telenovelas
Televisa telenovelas
Las Estrellas original programming
Mexican television series based on Colombian television series
Spanish-language telenovelas